The Red and Blue Chair is a chair designed in 1917 by Gerrit Rietveld. It represents one of the first explorations by the De Stijl art movement in three dimensions. It was not painted its distinct colors until the early 1920s. Multiple versions of the chair exist and are housed in various collections.

History 
The Red and Blue Chair is a chair designed in 1917 by Gerrit Rietveld. It represents one of the first explorations by the De Stijl art movement in three dimensions. It features several Rietveld joints.

The original chair was constructed of unstained beech wood and was not painted red, blue, yellow, and black until around 1923. Fellow member of De Stijl and architect, Bart van der Leck, saw his original model and suggested that he add bright colours. He built the new model of thinner wood and painted it entirely black with areas of primary colors attributed to De Stijl movement. The effect of this color scheme made the chair seem to almost disappear against the black walls and floor of the Rietveld Schröder House, where it was later placed. The areas of color appeared to float, giving it an almost transparent structure.

A version of the chair was sold by Christies in 2011 for €10,625.

Construction 
In Rietveld's instructions on how to build the chair, he informs the craftsperson to print the following verse from Der Aesthet by Christian Morgenstern and attach it under the seat:

Collections 
The Museum of Modern Art houses the chair in its permanent collection—a gift from Philip Johnson— and an original example is on display at the Brooklyn Museum in New York City. A version of the chair also resides at the High Museum of Art, Atlanta.

The Red and Blue Chair was on loan to the Delft University of Technology Faculty of Architecture as part of an exhibition when a fire destroyed the entire building in May 2008. The Red and Blue Chair was saved by firefighters.

See also 
 Zig-Zag Chair

References

External links 

 
 
 
 

De Stijl
Chairs
Individual pieces of furniture
Gerrit Rietveld